Lalita  is one of the nine principal gopis within traditional Gaudiya Vaishnava worship of Radha and Krishna within the Hindu religion.

Of the eight Varistha Gopis, Astasakhis, Lalita is the foremost. She is a friend of the Divine Couple, Sri Sri Radha Krishna. Her age is 14 years, 8 months and 27 days. She is the oldest of Krishna's gopi friends. Lalita resides in Yavat and is famous as Radha's constant companion. She is the personification of Khandita Bhava and the leader of the parama-prema sakis. Her kunja, the color of lightning, is the largest and is situated on the North side of Vrindavan. The personified seasons take eternally personal care of the kunja. Shaped like an 8 petal lotus, it expands and contracts when needed. Lalitadevi instructs and directs all the sakis and is an expert in the tactics of union and separation in the matter of prema. Lalitadevi is known for her contradictory and hot tempered nature (vama-prakhara). Her complexion is the color of gorochana (bright yellow pigment prepared from the urine of a cow) and her garments are the brilliant colors of peacock tail feathers.

Rupa manjari (Rupa Goswami) is the assistant and follower of Lalita-sakhi; thus all who consider themselves as Rupanuga bhaktas (followers of Rupa Goswami) are ultimately the servants of Lalita Devi and thus through the media of the parampara should always be longing to engage in the service of her lotus feet. When the day comes at which we are given the opportunity to serve her, she will engage us in the intimate loving service of Sri Sri Radha-Krishna according to
our heart's desire (Radha-Krishna-ganoddesa-dipika).

Among the Gopikas

Within Vaishnava theology and Gaudiya Vaishnava tradition, Lalita is amongst the eight principle Gopis, known as 'Sakhis' or friends of Srimati Radharani, Lord Krishna's highest loving consort. Her mother is Saradi and her father is Vishoka. Her husband is Sri Krishna 

She tends to side with Srimati Radharani during disputes between Lord Krishna and Radharani. She is renowned for her "mana", or pure loving anger. Among the Gopis, Lalita and Vishaka are considered to be the foremost.

Along with Mohan (Krishna) Lalitadevi had 68 tirthas (holy places) to visit in her kunda and free everyone from the six types of hatya (murder): bhroona-hatya (abortion), krimi-hatya (killing of worms and insects), go-hatya (cow slaughter), brahma-hatya (killing of brahmans), svana-hatya, atma-hatya (suicide).

This pastime was in preparation for the appearance of Radha Kunda, which took place when Krishna killed Aristasura (a demon in the shape of a bull). After Krishna killed Arista, he visited Lalita Kunda to free himself of the sin of gohatya. The internal reason was that he wanted to associate with Srimati Radharani and to enjoy the pastime of creating their kundas (Radha Kunda and Shyama Kunda). To attain Radharani's association, he had to first please and receive help from Lalitadevi, the friend and guardian of Srimati Radharani. Even Lord Krishna must approach Lalitadevi first and by her blessings have his desire fulfilled.

When Krishna met Radharani that night, she told him that due to his having killed a bull, he would have to bathe in all the holy places first to become purified. Krishna informed her that he had bathed in Lalita's kunda, which purified one of the six kinds of murder due to the presence of the major tirthas. Radharani's sakhis challenged him that they did not see, feel or hear those tirthas in Lalita's kunda so how could they possibly accept. Then Krishna visited all the holy places in person and had them introduce themselves before entering into his kunda, so that later the gopi girls could not challenge Him. When Lalita saw this, she took some of the waters of Radha-kunda and Shyama-kunda and poured them into her own kunda, after which the water of Shyama-kunda burst through the embankment to mingle with the water of Lalita-kunda in divine union.

Special talents
 Leader of all the sakhis of Srimati Radharani
 Magnanimous like her father
 Instigator of most pastimes
 Always displays contrariness to Krishna's suggestions
 Frequently becomes angry and speaks outrageously insolent retorts to increase the intensity of love between Radha and Krishna.
 Composing and understanding riddles
 Fashioning things with flowers including awnings, dancing arenas, umbrellas, couches, bowers
 Performing magic tricks and juggling.

Mantra

Lalita's mantra is: namo pataka-vighna-aghnau
lalita-mohanau subhau
snapaye-ham vimoksaya
kundau nira-manoharau  (Skanda Purana)

I offer my obeisances to Sri Lalita Kunda who is most beautiful with
sparkling water, who grants liberation to the bather, who is most auspicious manifestation of Lalita Devi's love for Sri Krishna and who destroys all the obstacles on the path of pure devotional service.

In the same way Radha-kunda and Shyama-kunda are the same as Radha Krishna, so Lalita's kunda is her liquid form. Lalita-kunda is all merciful and by coming in contact with her water, bowing down to offer prayers and remembering her, the supplicant can attain the mercy of Radha-kunda and find an eternal residence close to her.

See also
Meera - devotee who declared herself Lalita's reincarnation 
Bhakti
Rasa lila
Vrindavan

References

2. Rādhā-kṛṣṇa-gaṇoddeśa-dīpikā; Rūpa Gosvāmī.

Further reading
Dictionary of Hindu Lore and Legend by Anna Dhallapiccola

External links
The Lalita-astakam of Rupa Goswami

Religion in Uttar Pradesh